Catherine Rabett (born 20 July 1960), sometimes known as Katie Rabett, is a British actress.

She played Cecily "Cissy" Meldrum in the BBC sitcom You Rang, M'Lord? (1988–1993). She was a member of Hot Gossip, Arlene Phillips's groundbreaking dance group, and performed on The Kenny Everett Video Show.

Rabett was married to comic performer and scriptwriter Kit Hesketh-Harvey from 1986 until their divorce in 2021; they had two children.

She gained a First class honours degree in Art History from the University of East Anglia. She curated the "Art of Faith in East Anglia" exhibition at Norwich Castle Museum 2011/13, and was picture researcher on Houghton Hall: Portrait of an English House by David Cholmondeley and Andrew Moore published by Skira Rizzoli October 2014 and Capability Brown: Designing English Landscapes and Gardens by John Phibbs also published by Rizzoli November 2016.

Rabett also works as a volunteer UK representative for GRUBB Forward, a UK-based charity providing tutoring at three schools for Roma children in Serbia. GRUBB Forward also produces the GRUBB Show, a performance blending traditional Roma and contemporary music. The GRUBB Show has toured the world and the revenue is used to support the GRUBB Schools.

During the Covid pandemic Rabett trained and worked as a volunteer St John Ambulance vaccinator.

Theatre roles
The Grace Kelly role in Dial M for Murder, on tour and in the West End (1999–2002)
The lead in The Thirty-Nine Steps (2003–2005)

Selected film and television roles
The Kenny Everett Television Show (1981) – Sexy girls
Fords on Water (1983) – Madeline
Real Life (1984) – Kate
Minder, Windows (1984) – Louise
The Adventures of Sherlock Holmes – The Adventure of the Crooked Man (1984) – Young Nancy Barclay/Devoy
C.A.T.S. Eyes, Goodbye Jenny Wren (1985) – Jenny Kenwright
Auf Wiedersehen, Pet, Another Country – Carol Pringle
Fresh Fields, Happy Returns (1986) – Monica
Chance in a Million, The Blessing (1986) – WPC Madigan
The Living Daylights (1987) – Liz 
Maurice (1987) – Pippa Durham
Confessional (1989) – Jane Barclay
Frankenstein Unbound (1990) – Elizabeth Levenza, Victor's fiancée
Bergerac, All for Love (1991) – Jane
You Rang, M'Lord? (1988–1993) – Cissy Meldrum 
Agatha Christie's Poirot – Hercule Poirot's Christmas (1995) – Lydia Lee

References

External links

1960 births
Living people
20th-century English actresses
21st-century English actresses
Actresses from London
Alumni of the University of East Anglia
English television actresses